The Survivor is a 1969 novel by Australian author Thomas Keneally.

Awards and nominations
Captain Cook Bicentenary Awards, Novel Section, 1970: joint winner

Notes
Dedication: "To W. H. Crook"

1972 TV Movie

The novel was adapted for TV by the ABC in 1972.

References

External links
Blog review

Reviews
 "Southerly" Vol 30 No 1, 1970, by Michael Wilding
The Survivor at AustLit

Australian television films
1986 television films
1986 films
1969 Australian novels
Novels by Thomas Keneally
Angus & Robertson books
1980s English-language films
1970s English-language films